Pazik is a surname. Notable people with the surname include:

 Kristen Pazik (born 1978), American and British model
 Mike Pazik (born 1950), American baseball player
 Tom Pazik (1940–1993), American dancer